Middleburg Plantation is a historic colonial-era plantation on the Cooper River near Huger, South Carolina.  The plantation house,  built in 1697 by the French Huguenot Benjamin Simons, is probably the oldest standing wood-frame building in South Carolina, and is consequently an architecturally important example of period construction.  It was declared a National Historic Landmark in 1970.

Description and history

Middleburg Plantation is located southwest of Huger, between Cainhoy Road and the Cooper River. It is topped by a hip roof, and is three rooms wide and one deep, with single-story porches on both of its long sides. The walls are sheathed in wooden clapboards, and it has two chimneys. Its plan is a precursor to what became the typical Charleston "single house". Each floor has three rooms, with the stairwell on the north side of the central room, and a narrow hallway extending on the upper level's north side. Exterior walls are plastered, and floors are made of wide boards. Extending to the west is an ell that was added in the late 18th century, the last significant alteration to the building.

Middleburg was established in 1699 by Benjamin Simons, a French Huguenot refugee, who named it after the Dutch city of Middelburg, the capital of the Province of Zeeland, Walcheren Island where Simons fled to from France before crossing the Ocean to America. At the time of its designation as a National Historic Landmark in 1970, the house was still in the hands of Simons' descendants. The plantation includes two later outbuildings: a 19th-century carriage house with fine jigsawn woodwork, and a brick commissary building that includes a slave jail in its rear.

See also
 List of the oldest buildings in South Carolina
 List of National Historic Landmarks in South Carolina
 National Register of Historic Places listings in Berkeley County, South Carolina

References

External links
 
 Middleburg Plantation, Berkeley County (on the Cooper River, Huger vicinity), at South Carolina Department of Archives and History
 

Historic American Buildings Survey in South Carolina
National Historic Landmarks in South Carolina
Houses in Berkeley County, South Carolina
1699 establishments in South Carolina
Houses on the National Register of Historic Places in South Carolina
National Register of Historic Places in Berkeley County, South Carolina
Plantations in South Carolina
Plantation houses in South Carolina